Chudleigh Knighton Halt was on the Teign Valley Line serving the small village of Chudleigh Knighton, Devon, England. The halt, built by the Great Western Railway at a later date than most of the other stations on the line, was located on the west side of Pipehouse Lane off the B3344, to the south of the village.

The first station was constructed of timber with a small corrugated iron pagoda shelter and a simple nameboard, at a cost £300. After WW2 a concrete platform was provided. A level crossing was located at the platform end. The track was still in situ in 1969, but goods facilities were withdrawn on 4 December 1967.

Passenger numbers reached their peak in the 1930s with seven daily services provided each way between Exeter and Heathfield. During World War 2 this was reduced to four trains in each direction, still with no trains on a Sunday. This was increased to five daily trains after the war.

The A38 road now runs over the site of the halt and nothing remains of the station.

References
Notes

Sources

Disused railway stations in Devon
Railway stations in Great Britain opened in 1924
Railway stations in Great Britain closed in 1958
Former Great Western Railway stations